Sharona Bakker (born 12 April 1990 in IJmuiden) is a Dutch athlete specialising in the sprint hurdles. She represented her country at the 2012 World Indoor Championships reaching the semifinals.

Her personal bests are 12.85 seconds in the 100 metres hurdles (0.0 m/s, Zürich 2014) and 8.03 seconds in the 60 metres hurdles (Karlsruhe 2012).

International competitions

References

1990 births
Living people
People from Velsen
Dutch female hurdlers
Sportspeople from North Holland